Smear may refer to:

A smear test, wherein a sample is smeared over a microscope slide to be studied for any pathology
A smear test usually refers to a pap test, that is, a cervical smear
Smear (card game)
Smear Lake, a lake in Wisconsin
Smear campaign, or smear job,  an attack on the reputation of an individual or group making use of disinformation tactics
Smear Campaign (album), an album by Napalm Death
Pat Smear, the guitarist and actor
Smear (optics), motion that degrades sharpness, which is generally linear over the integration time
Colloquial name for a glissando, a glide from one musical pitch to another

Smearing may refer to:
 Smearing of an image taken by an astronomical interferometer:
 Bandwidth smearing, a chromatic aberration;
 Time smearing, a consequence of Earth rotation during the observation;
 Smearing (climbing), a technique of rock climbing
 Electron smearing, a tool for improving convergence in DFT calculations

See also
Smeared, the debut studio album by Canadian rock band Sloan